Phillip Francis Straling (born April 25, 1933) is an American prelate of the Roman Catholic Church.  He served as bishop of the Diocese of San Bernardino in California from 1978 to 1995, and as bishop of the Diocese of Reno in Nevada from 1995 to 2005.

Biography

Early life and ministry
Phillip Straling was born on April 25, 1933 in San Bernardino, California.  He was ordained into the priesthood by Bishop Charles Buddy for the Diocese of San Diego on March 19, 1959.  He served 11 years in campus ministry before serving as executive secretary of the second Synod of the Diocese of San Diego. In 1976, Straling became pastor of Holy Rosary Parish in San Bernardino.

Bishop of San Bernardino
On July 14, 1978, Pope Paul VI named Straling as the first bishop of the newly created Diocese of San Bernardino. He was consecrated on November 6, 1978 by Cardinal Timothy Manning.  The co-consecrators were Archbishop John Quinn and Bishop Leo Maher.  

During Straling's episcopate, the diocese grew from about 235,000 people to 800,000, and from 85 parishes to 105.  For the formation for ministry he established a diaconate program, and started the Straling Institute in 1980 for laymen.  On January 28, 1992, Pope John Paul II named Gerald Barnes as the first auxiliary bishop of the diocese and Straling consecrated him on March 18 of the same year.

Bishop of Reno
On March 21, 1995, Pope John Paul II divided the Diocese of Reno-Las Vegas into two dioceses and appointed Straling as bishop of the new Diocese of Reno. He was installed on June 29, 1995 and served there for ten years. 

Pope Benedict XVI accepted Straling's letter of resignation as bishop of the Diocese of Reno on June 21, 2005.

See also
 

 Catholic Church hierarchy
 Catholic Church in the United States
 Historical list of the Catholic bishops of the United States
 List of Catholic bishops of the United States
 Lists of patriarchs, archbishops, and bishops

References

External links
Roman Catholic Diocese of Reno Official Site

Episcopal succession

1933 births
Living people
People from San Bernardino, California
Roman Catholic bishops of Reno
20th-century Roman Catholic bishops in the United States
21st-century Roman Catholic bishops in the United States